The NIST RBAC model is a standardized definition of role-based access control.  Although originally developed by the National Institute of Standards and Technology, the standard was adopted and is copyrighted and distributed as INCITS 359-2004 by the International Committee for Information Technology Standards (INCITS).  
The latest version is INCITS 359-2012.
It is managed by INCITS committee CS1.

History
In 2000, NIST called for a unified standard for RBAC, integrating the RBAC model published in 1992 by Ferraiolo and Kuhn  with the RBAC framework introduced by Sandhu, Coyne, Feinstein, and Youman (1996).  This proposal was published by Sandhu, Ferraiolo, and Kuhn

and presented at the ACM 5th Workshop on Role Based Access Control. Following debate and comment within the RBAC and security communities, NIST made revisions and proposed a U.S. national standard for RBAC through the INCITS.  In 2004, the standard received ballot approval and was adopted as INCITS 359-2004.  Sandhu, Ferraiolo, and Kuhn later published an explanation of the design choices in the model.
 
In 2010, NIST announced a revision to RBAC, incorporating features of attribute-based access control (ABAC).

See also 
 Role-based access control

References

External links
 NIST RBAC web site
 INCITS web site

Computer access control
Computer security models
Data security
Firewall software
Packets (information technology)